Cream of Tartar Works Platform was a railway station located on the Sandown railway line in the then-industrial suburb of Camellia in Sydney, Australia. The station opened 7 March 1927 and served the Australian Cream Tartar Company factory in Camellia. It closed in July 1959, the same year the Sandown line was electrified in August.

Cream of Tartar was among a number of companies that had private sidings on the line.

References 

Disused railway stations in Sydney